Kate Louise Natkiel (born 24 September 1992) is an English football midfielder who plays for Crystal Palace in the FA Women's Championship.

Natkiel joined Arsenal's youth academy under-10s and progressed through the age-groups at the North London club. She also represented Hoddesdon Owls at youth level. She moved on to Watford and remained with the Golden Girls for almost six years, departing as the club's longest serving player in July 2015.

She signed for Brighton & Hove Albion, where she had previously spent a loan spell in 2013–14.

References

External links

1992 births
Women's association football midfielders
Brighton & Hove Albion W.F.C. players
Women's Super League players
English women's footballers
Watford F.C. Women players
Living people
Portsmouth F.C. Women players
Crystal Palace F.C. (Women) players
Women's Championship (England) players